CVX may refer to:

Chevron Corporation (NYSE stock ticker: CVX)
Charlevoix Municipal Airport (FAA airport code CVX)
Critical Viscosity of Xenon experiment
Christian Life Community
Chinese VX (EA-6043), an organophosphate nerve agent of the V-series
CVX-class aircraft carrier, South Korean aircraft carrier class in development

See also

Gerald R. Ford-class aircraft carrier, codenamed CVNX in development
CVX Live, a YouTuber convention
CV (disambiguation)
CV10 (disambiguation)